Wolfgang Erndl (10 September 1921 – February 1994) was an Austrian sailor. He competed at the 1952 Summer Olympics and the 1956 Summer Olympics.

References

External links
 

1921 births
1994 deaths
Austrian male sailors (sport)
Olympic sailors of Austria
Sailors at the 1952 Summer Olympics – Finn
Sailors at the 1956 Summer Olympics – Finn
Place of birth missing